A buki  is a brass instrument from Svaneti (north-west part of Georgia).

See also
 Nafir

References 

Musical instruments of Georgia (country)
Brass instruments